is a park at 956 Gokatsura in Taki, Mie Prefecture, Japan. It was opened 1984.

Gokatsura Pond 
 It is a reservoir that was established in 1679. It is the largest pond (by area) within Mie Prefecture.

Data of the pond 
4.5 km in surroundings
Area 19.5 ha
Amount of water contained 1,716,000 m³

History 
1672－ The construction of the pond began in Gokatsura District by the order of the Kii Domain. Mitani Sōzan was the man put in charge of the construction project.
1679－The pond was completed after seven years. The number of people mobilized is thought to be around 152,000 people.
 During construction, 25 resident families were displaced by the pond and were relocated to various locations.

Works about the pond 
The Story Of Gokatsura Pond  "Kuchinashi-no-Hana"－ A work that portrayed the plight and struggle of the families relocated during the construction of the pond which was presented by the theatrical company "Shirotsubaki" in 2002.

The main facilities 
 Flower and petting-zoo plaza- An elephant had once been kept as an attraction. There is a Ferris wheel.
 Smiling golf
 Campground
 Barbecue plaza
 Japanese style restaurant- There is a footbath as part of the facilities.
 The Grandchildren's shop (まごの店 Mago no Mise）- A restaurant managed by the students of the nearby Oka high school culinary program. Students from this school have received great acclaim for their success in cooking competitions, both on the domestic and international level, and their reputation draws customers from as far as the neighboring prefectures with great frequency.
The Grandma's shop (specialty shop)- It sells farm products.
 Ceramic art classroom
 Fruit picking- Persimmon, "Mikan" oranges, and strawberries can be harvested, depending on the season.

History 

 1964-"Mikan" orange picking starts around Gokatsura pond.
 1980-People who live in Gokatsura hold a symposium concerning the promotion of the area and addressing agricultural issues. Afterwards, a "Green, irregular committee" met 46 times, designing a project plan for establishing the Gokatsura Pond Furusato Village.
 1984- Gokatsura Pond Furusato Village is opened. It drew around 160,000 people in its first year.
 1989-Smiling golf opens.
 1993-The petting-zoo plaza opens.
 1999-The grandma's shop opens.
 2005-The Grandchildren's shop is established.

Management 
The government of Taki Town was set up administrative section based on "Ordinance concerning the installation and the management of Taki-cho Gokatsura pond Furusato Village", and it is managed by local citizens.

Business hours 
 The flower and the petting-zoo plaza: 10 o'clock to 16 o'clock (Until 16:30, April–October)
 The Grandchildren's shop: As soon as it is sold out at 10:45
 Campground: 14:00 until 10:00am of the next day
 Conference room and related facilities: 17 o'clock from nine o'clock
 The fruit picking: 10 o'clock to 15 o'clock (Strawberry picking : until 16 o'clock)
 Additionally: 8 o'clock to 17 o'clock

Closed 
 The second Tuesday of every month except August

Access 
Railway
It is 34 minutes on foot from JR Kisei Line Sana Station.
About 15 minutes by taxi from JR Kisei Line and Sangu Line Taki Station.
Bus
Get off Taki Citizen Bus Sana Line "Furusato-mura-mae".
It operates only on the Monday, Wednesday, and Friday.
Car
About five minutes from Ise Expressway Seiwa-Taki interchange.

Sources 
History: http://www.pref.mie.jp/muras/satoweb/satodukuri/22.pdf
Management: Ordinance concerning installation and management of Taki-cho Gokatsura pond Furusato Village(No.167 of Taki-cho ordinance on March 22, 2006)

Footnote

External links
Official Website of Gokatsura Pond Furusato Village.

Tourist attractions in Mie Prefecture
Parks and gardens in Mie Prefecture